The 2021–22 season was the 64th season in the existence of FC Ural Yekaterinburg and the club's 19th consecutive season in the top flight of Russian football. In addition to the domestic league, FC Ural Yekaterinburg are participated in this season's editions of the Russian Cup.

Players

Other players under contract

Out on loan

Transfers

Summer

In:

Out:

Winter

In:

Out:

Pre-season and friendlies

Competitions

Overview

Premier League

League table

Results summary

Results by round

Results

Russian Cup

Round of 32

Squad statistics

Appearances and goals

|-
|colspan="14"|Players who suspended their contracts:

|-
|colspan="14"|Players away from the club on loan:

|-
|colspan="14"|Players who appeared for Ural Yekaterinburg but left during the season:

|}

Goal scorers

Clean sheets

Disciplinary record

References

FC Ural Yekaterinburg seasons
Ural Yekaterinburg